= Ranabir Chakravarti =

Indian historian of early India (born 1953)

- Born: 1953; Kolkata, India
- Citizenship: Indian
- Occupations: Historian, professor
- Known for: Social and economic history of early India; Indian Ocean maritime history

Academic background
- Education: University of Calcutta (PhD)

Academic work
- Discipline: Social and economic history of early India; Indian Ocean maritime history
- Institutions: University of Calcutta; Jawaharlal Nehru University
- Notable works: Trade and Traders in Early Indian Society; Exploring Early India up to c. AD 1300; The Pull Towards the Coast

Ranabir Chakravarti (born 1953) is an Indian historian of early India. He is a former professor of ancient history at the Centre for Historical Studies, Jawaharlal Nehru University, New Delhi. He specialises in the social and economic history of early India, with a particular interest in the maritime history of the Indian Ocean before 1500 CE.

== Career ==
Earlier in his career, Chakravarti was professor in the Department of Ancient Indian History and Culture at the University of Calcutta. He later became professor of ancient history at the Centre for Historical Studies, Jawaharlal Nehru University, New Delhi.

He was a member of the Institute for Advanced Study, Princeton, in 2005–2006, working on India's maritime trade in the western Indian Ocean (700–1500). He was a fellow in residence at the Netherlands Institute for Advanced Study from 1 September 2009 to 31 January 2010.

He has retired from Jawaharlal Nehru University. In March 2025, he was a scholar in residence at the University of Hyderabad, where he delivered a lecture titled "From the Sardulakarnavadanam to Tagore's Chandalika".

== Works ==
Chakravarti is an author of several books on the social and economic history of early India and the Indian Ocean world.

=== Books ===
- Warfare for Wealth: Early Indian Perspective (Firma KLM, Calcutta, 1986).
- Trade and Traders in Early Indian Society (3rd edition, Routledge, 2020).
- Exploring Early India up to c. AD 1300 (Macmillan, 2010; 3rd edition, Primus Books, 2016).
- The Pull Towards the Coast and Other Essays: The Indian Ocean History and the Subcontinent before 1500 CE (Primus Books, 2020).

=== Reception ===
Exploring Early India was reviewed by Suchandra Ghosh in South Asian Studies. Ghosh wrote that the book presents "balanced assessments and a nuanced yet lucid account" of early India.

Trade and Traders in Early Indian Society was reviewed by R. Mahalakshmi in the Summerhill: IIAS Review. The Pull Towards the Coast was reviewed by Digvijay Kumar Singh in The Book Review. Singh wrote that the essays in the volume "underscore the seminal role of Ranabir Chakravarti's scholarship in the study of the maritime history of Indian littorals in the pre-1500 CE period". It was also reviewed by Ashish Kumar in the Panjab University Research Journal (Social Sciences). Bhairabi Prasad Sahu also reviewed it in Studies in People's History.

=== Edited volumes ===
- Trade in Early India (Oxford University Press, 2001).

Nigel Harris, reviewing the volume in the Economic and Political Weekly, wrote that the book was "excellent, consistently stimulating, judicious and throughout most scholarly".

- Indo-Judaic Studies in the Twenty-First Century: A View from the Margin (Palgrave Macmillan, 2007), co-edited with Nathan Katz, Braj M. Sinha and Shalva Weil.
- History of Bangladesh: Early Bengal in Regional Perspectives (up to c. 1200 CE), 2 volumes (Asiatic Society of Bangladesh, 2018), co-edited with Abdul Momin Chowdhury.
- The Coveted Mount: The Horse in South Asian History (Cambridge University Press, 2026), co-edited with Pratyay Nath.

== Honours and recognition ==
A festschrift in his honour, The Economic History of India: Historiographical Issues and Perspectives - Essays in Honour of Professor Ranabir Chakravarti, was published by Bloomsbury India in 2023. It was launched on 7 September 2023 at the India International Centre, New Delhi, at an event chaired by Romila Thapar.

Exploring Early India is prescribed as essential reading on the University of Delhi BA History syllabus.
